Mela is used in the Indian subcontinent for all sizes of gatherings: religious, commercial, cultural or sport-related.

Mela may also refer to:

Arts and entertainment
Mela (1948 film), an Indian romantic tragedy
Mela (1971 film), an Indian family drama
Mela (1980 film), a Malayalam-language film
Mela (1986 film), a Pakistani action film
Mela (2000 film), an Indian action masala film
Mela (Ugandan TV series), 2018

People 
 Mela (Miller), an early settler in Hawaii
 Arnaud Méla (born 1980), a French rugby player
 Ghias Mela (1961–2015), a Pakistani politician
 Francisco Mela (born 1968), a Cuban percussionist 
 Itala Mela (1904–1957), an Italian Roman Catholic mystic
 Jan Mela (born 1988), a Polish explorer
 Jaime Mela (1890–?), a Spanish fencer
 Natalia Mela (1923–2019), a Greek sculptor
 Pomponius Mela (died c. AD 45), a Roman geographer

Places
 Mela, Corse-du-Sud, Corsica, France
 Mela (Bithynia), a city in the Roman province of Bithynia Secunda

Other uses
 Mela (company), a global entertainment consumer service 
 MELA Sciences, an American medical device company
 MELA (Mothers of East Los Angeles), an American anti-prison construction group
 MeLA, an Italian people mover located in Milan
 Melakarta, or Mela, a collection of fundamental musical scales (ragas) in Carnatic music

See also

 Melas (disambiguation)
 Carmela, a given name